Redcliff may refer to:

Canada
 Redcliff, Alberta
England
 Redcliff Point, Dorset
 Redcliff, East Riding of Yorkshire, boulder clay cliff on the Humber Estuary bank, archaeological site
United States
 Redcliff (Colorado), a high mountain summit in Colorado, U.S.
 Red Cliff, Wisconsin
Zimbabwe
 Redcliff, Zimbabwe
 Redcliff (parliamentary constituency)

See also
Redcliffs, a suburb of Christchurch, Canterbury, New Zealand
Redcliffe (disambiguation)
Radcliffe (disambiguation)
Ratcliffe (disambiguation)